The 2021–22 Santosh Trophy was the 75th edition of the Santosh Trophy, the premier competition in India for teams representing their regional and state football associations. The last season was cancelled due to COVID-19 pandemic in India.

The main round of the tournament was held in Malappuram, and was contested by 10 teams divided into two groups. Kerala and West Bengal from Group A and Manipur and Karnataka from Group B reached the semi-finals, and eventually Kerala and West Bengal faced in the final. Kerala won their seventh title after defeating West Bengal in the penalties.

Qualification

The zonal qualifiers were contested by 37 teams representing the states and the union territories of India, including one representing the Indian Armed Forces. The teams were drawn into five zones (North, East, North-East, South and West) of two groups each. Only 2 teams (1 from each group) from each zone could qualify for the final round.

North

East

North-East

South

West

Draw
The official draw for the 75th edition of Santosh Trophy was held on 6 January 2022  at 15:00 IST in New Delhi with former India defender Gouramangi Singh assisting in the process. Ten teams who came through the qualifiers were drawn into two groups of five each for the main event beginning from 16 April. On 31 March the host of the event was announced to be Malappuram, Kerala, with the matches being held at Kottappadi Stadium and Payyanad Stadium.

Group stage

Group A

Group B

Knockout stage

Bracket

Semi-finals

Final

Statistics

Top goalscorer

Prize money

Awards

References

External links
 Santosh Trophy on the All India Football Federation website .

Santosh Trophy seasons
2021–22 Santosh Trophy